Tishanka is a rural locality (a khutor) in Mikhaylovka Urban Okrug, Volgograd Oblast, Russia. The population was 12 as of 2010.

Geography 
Tishanka is located 21 km northeast of Mikhaylovka. Mokhovsky is the nearest rural locality.

References 

Rural localities in Mikhaylovka urban okrug